Festuca pratensis, the meadow fescue, is a perennial species of grass, which is often used as an ornamental grass in gardens, and is also an important forage crop.

It grows in meadows, roadsides, old pastures, and riversides on moist, rich soils, especially on loamy and heavy soils.

It is a tall, tufted grass similar to the tall fescue, Festuca arundinacea.  Tall fescue differs by having minute hairs on the auricles.  It can hybridise with 
Lolium perenne and Lolium multiflorum.

Description
It is a perennial bunchgrass, (i.e. grows in tufts), which grows , flowering from June until August.  The panicles are green to purplish.  The spikelets have 5 to 14 flowers.

It has a short, blunt ligule compared to other grasses 1 mm high. The leaves are bright green and up to 4 mm across.

Gallery

References

External links
 
 
 
 

pratensis
Bunchgrasses of Europe